The 2012–13 Maltese Third Division (also known as 2012–13 BOV 3rd Division due to sponsorship reasons) began on 16 September 2012 and ended on 5 May 2013.

Participating teams

 Attard F.C
 Ghaxaq F.C
 Kalkara F.C.
 Luqa St. Andrew's F.C.
 Marsa F.C.
 Marsaskala F.C.
 Mdina Knights F.C.
 Mtarfa F.C.
 Qrendi F.C.
 Senglea Athletic F.C.
 Sirens F.C.
 St. Lucia F.C.
 Swieqi United
 Ta' Xbiex F.C.
 Xghajra Tornadoes F.C.

Changes from previous season
They were replaced with Attard F.C., Senglea Athletic F.C. and Luqa St. Andrew's F.C., relegated from 2011–12 Maltese Second Division .
Ta' Xbiex F.C. returned to Maltese football after an absence of 5 years.

Final league table

External links
  Final League Table
  Results
 Senglea Champions
 Marsa and Marsascala Promoted
 Mdina Knights Promoted

Maltese Third Division seasons
4
Malta